Kharijapikon is a census town in Goalpara district in the Indian state of Assam.

Demographics
 India census, Kharijapikon had a population of 5833. Males constitute 57% of the population and females 43%. Kharijapikon has an average literacy rate of 73%, higher than the national average of 59.5%: male literacy is 80%, and female literacy is 64%. In Kharijapikon, 13% of the population is under 6 years of age.

References

Cities and towns in Goalpara district
Goalpara district